Olenecamptus riparius is a species of beetle in the family Cerambycidae. It was described by Mikhail Leontievich Danilevsky in 2011. It is known from Russia, China and Japan.

References

Dorcaschematini
Beetles described in 2011